The Little Lottery River is a river of the northeast of New Zealand's South Island. It flows southwest through the Amuri Range, flowing into the Lottery River, part of the Waiau River system.

See also
List of rivers of New Zealand

References

Rivers of Canterbury, New Zealand
Rivers of New Zealand